Stephen Gray (30 November 1941 – 22 October 2020) was a South African writer and critic.

Career
Gray was born in Cape Town on 30 November 1941. He studied at St. Andrew's College, Grahamstown, and later at the University of Cape Town, Cambridge University, England (where he received a Bachelor of Arts and a Masters of Arts, both in English), and the University of Iowa, US (where he studied a Masters of Fine Arts in creative writing). He was also awarded a D. Litt and d. Phil. by Rand Afrikaans University, Johannesburg in 1978. Until 1992, he was Professor of English at the Rand Afrikaans University in Johannesburg.

Gray was a prolific poet and published eight novels. Recurrent themes include attitudes to homosexuality and the many rewritings of history in South Africa, including examining attitudes to class and race. His literary journalism appeared in the South African weekly newspaper, the Mail & Guardian, from the 1990s to the 2010s. He also wrote for the theatre and edited collections of work by Athol Fugard and Herman Charles Bosman.

Gray died on 22 October 2020 in Johannesburg at the age of 78.

Published works
[Note: Gray has been published in many countries by various publishers in other editions. consult ISBN in WorldCat and other sources for multiple editions.]

Novels and short stories

 Local Colour. Ravan Press, 1975. 
 Visible People. R. Collings, 1977. .
 Caltrop's Desire. Africa Book Centre, 1980. .
 Time of our Darkness. Arrow, 1988. .
 Born of Man. Gay Men's Press, 1989. .
 War Child. Serif, 1994. .
 My Serial Killer and other Short Stories. Jacana Media, 2005.

Plays

 Schreiner: A One-Woman Play. David Philip, 1983. .

Poetry

 It's About Time. David Philip, 1974. .
 Hottentot Venus and other Poems. David Philip, 1979.
 Love Poems: Hate Poems. Bellew Publishing, 1982. .
 Apollo Café and Other Poems, 1982-89. David Philip, 1989. .
 Season of Violence, Justified Press, 1992. 
 Selected Poems 1960-92, David Philip, 1994. 
 Gabriel's Exhibition, Mayibuye Books, 1998.

As editor

 C. Louis Leipoldt. Stormwrack. David Philip, 1980. .
 Modern South African Poetry. A. D. Donker, 1984. .
 The Penguin Book of Southern African Stories. Penguin, 1985. .
 The Penguin Book of Southern African Verse. Penguin, 1988. .
 South Africa Plays: New South African Drama. Nick Hern, 1994. .
 Charles Rawden Maclean alias John Ross. The Natal Papers of "John Ross". U of Natal P, 1996. .

Other

 Southern African Literature: An Introduction. Barnes & Noble Imports, 1979. .
 John Ross: The True Story. 1987.
 Human Interest and Other Pieces. Justified Press, 1993. .
 Accident of Birth: An Autobiography. COSAW Publishing, 1993. .
 Free-lancers and Literary Biography in South Africa. Editions Rodopi BV, 1999. .
 Life Sentence: A Biography of Herman Charles Bosman. Human & Rousseau, 2005. .

References

 
Gray, Stephen (Ed.) Modern South African Poetry. A. D. Donker, 1984. .

External links
Stephen Gray Collection at the Harry Ransom Center

1941 births
2020 deaths
20th-century South African poets
South African male novelists
South African non-fiction writers
University of Cape Town alumni
South African LGBT novelists
South African male poets
Alumni of St. Andrew's College, Grahamstown
20th-century South African male writers
Male non-fiction writers